Camilo Reijers de Oliveira (born 23 February 1999), simply known as Camilo, is a Brazilian professional footballer who plays as a midfielder for Belgian club RWDM, on loan from the French club Lyon.

Club career
On 28 January 2020, Camilo was released from his club in Brazil to undergo a medical with French club Lyon.

On 28 January 2023, Camilo was loaned to RWDM in Belgium until the end of the season.

Career statistics

Honours
Ceará
Campeonato Mato-Grossense: 2021

References

External links
 OL profile
 
 

1999 births
Living people
Brazilian footballers
Association football midfielders
Campeonato Brasileiro Série A players
Campeonato Brasileiro Série B players
Associação Atlética Ponte Preta players
Cuiabá Esporte Clube players
Olympique Lyonnais players
RWDM47 players
Championnat National 2 players
Brazilian expatriate footballers
Brazilian expatriate sportspeople in France
Expatriate footballers in France
Brazilian expatriate sportspeople in Belgium
Expatriate footballers in Belgium
People from Mogi Mirim